Nimbahera Jatan is a village in Bhilwara district in Rajasthan, India

The village has a total population of 2,675 peoples and about 531 houses. It is located on SH-61 and well connected to Highway. Nearest railway station is Mandal (Bhilwara) and Airport is Maharana Pratap International Airport Dabok, Udaipur. This village's main occupation is agriculture.

References 

Villages in Bhilwara district